The 2015 Skate Canada International was the second event of six in the 2015–16 ISU Grand Prix of Figure Skating, a senior-level international invitational competition series. It was held at the ENMAX Centre in Lethbridge, Alberta on October 30 – November 1. Medals were awarded in the disciplines of men's singles, ladies' singles, pair skating, and ice dancing. Skaters earned points toward qualifying for the 2015–16 Grand Prix Final.

Entries

Changes to preliminary assignments
 On July 24, 2015, Ronald Lam announced his retirement. He was officially removed from the roster on August 21st. On September 4th, he was officially replaced with Kim Jin-seo.
 On August 21, Veronik Mallet was announced as a host pick.
 On September 2, Vanessa Grenier / Maxime Deschamps and Elisabeth Paradis / Francois Xavier Ouelette were announced as a host pick.
 On September 24, Joshua Farris was removed from the roster. U.S. Figure Skating announced he had to withdraw due to a concussion. On September 25th, it was announced that he was replaced by Timothy Dolensky. Dolensky was officially added to the roster on September 28th.
 On October 16, Elene Gedevanishvili was removed from the roster. No reason has been given. On October 19, her replacement was announced as Isabelle Olsson.
 On October 22, Peter Liebers was replaced by Sei Kawahara.

Results

Men

Ladies

Pairs

Ice dancing

References

External links
 2015 Skate Canada at the International Skating Union
 Starting orders and result details

Skate Canada International, 2015
Skate Canada International
2015 in Canadian sports 
2015 in Alberta